Khachaghbyur is a village in the Vardenis Municipality of the Gegharkunik Province of Armenia. The village is located immediately to the south of the Lusakunk village and to the west of Vardenis.

Etymology 
The village was previously known as Chakhyrlu, Chakhrlu, Chakhirlu, Sovietakert and Sovetakert.

History 
Near the village is a ruined Iron Age fort, Murad Khach, as well as a 13th-century church.

Gallery

References

External links 

 
 

Populated places in Gegharkunik Province